James Donald Tuohy (born June 21, 1954), known professionally as Jim Tooey, is an American film actor who has appeared in a total of 20 movies.

Born in Jersey City, Tuohy moved to Lyndhurst, New Jersey, at the age of 12, where he attended Lyndhurst High School before moving on to William Paterson University where he first developed an interest in acting.

Filmography
Foreign Exchange (2008) - Mr. Devina
Off Jackson Avenue (2008) (HBO Latin Film Festival) - Russ
Gardener of Eden (2007) - Loudmouth
Running Scared (2006) - Tony
Hot Under the Collar (2006) (TV) -
The Producers (2005) - Convict
Stand By (2003) - Vinny
Eloise at the Plaza (2003) (TV) (uncredited) - Doorman
Cremaster 3 (2002) - Grand Master

References

External links
 

1954 births
Living people
American male film actors
Lyndhurst High School alumni
Male actors from Jersey City, New Jersey
People from Lyndhurst, New Jersey
Male actors from New York City
William Paterson University alumni